Dangari is a village in Saikhowa Tehsil in Tinsukia District of Assam State, India. It is located 34 km towards East from District headquarters Tinsukia. 28 km from Saikhowa. 489 km from State capital Dispur. Dangari is surrounded by Sadiya Tehsil towards North, Hapjan Tehsil towards South, Saikhowa Tehsil towards west, Namsai Tehsil towards East.

Connectivity
Dangari is connected with railway line from Tinsukia and Makum railway junctions.

References

Tinsukia
Cities and towns in Tinsukia district